The 2012 Canadian Direct Insurance BC Men's Curling Championship (British Columbia's men's provincial curling championship) was held from February 8 to 12 at the Parksville Curling Club in Parksville, British Columbia. The winning team of Jim Cotter, represented British Columbia at the 2012 Tim Hortons Brier in Saskatoon, Saskatchewan.

Changes to championship format
For the 2011–12 season, the British Columbia Curling Association made changes to the men's championship format. The tournament will be held in a triple knockout format with sixteen teams, and the qualifiers will play in a four team page playoff. This will allow an additional six teams to compete, compared to the ten team round-robin system used in the 2010–11 season. Teams will qualify for the championship through the following berth allocations:

Defending Champion 
Top C.T.R.S Men's Team 
4 Qualifications from Open Event Qualification #1
4 Qualifications from Open Event Qualification #2
3 Qualifications from Open Event Qualification #3
3 Qualifications from Open Event Qualification #4

Teams

Results

A Event

B Event

C Event

Playoffs

1 vs. 2
February 11, 11:00 AM PT

3 vs. 4
February 11, 11:00 AM PT

Semifinal
February 11, 7:30 PM PT

Final
February 12, 5:00 PM PT

References

Canadian Direct Insurance BC Men's Championship
Parksville, British Columbia
Curling in British Columbia
Canadian Direct Insurance BC Men's Championship
Canadian Direct Insurance BC Men's Championship